Peppard may refer to: 

George Peppard (1928–1994), an American film and television actor
Mick Peppard (1877–1939), Australian rules footballer
Peppard (Reading ward), a local government ward in the Borough of Reading, England
Rotherfield Peppard, a village and civil parish in the county of Oxfordshire, England